Warner is an English, Finnish, Norwegian and Swedish given name that is an alternate form of Werner  that is in use throughout North America, Australia, New Zealand, Papua New Guinea, the Philippines, Peninsular Malaysia, India, Pakistan, the British Isles, Norway, Finland, Sweden, Republic of Karelia, Estonia, Guyana, Liberia, Sierra Leone, Ghana, Namibia, South Africa, Botswana, Zimbabwe, Zambia, Malawi, Tanzania, Uganda, Kenya, Sudan, South Sudan, Ethiopia, Cameroon and Nigeria. Notable people with this name include the following:

First name
Warner Anderson (1911–1976), American actor
Warner Batchelor (1934–2016), Australian boxer.
Warner Baxter (1889–1951), American film actor
Warner B. Bayley (1845–1928), American military officer
Warner Cope (1824–1903), American judge
Warner Earll (1814–1888), justice of the Supreme Court of Nevada
Warner Fite (1867–1955), American philosopher
Warner Fusselle (1944–2012), American sportscaster
Warner of Grez (died 1100), French nobleman
Warner Norton Grubb (1900–1947), American naval officer
Warner Norton Grubb III (1948–2015), American economist
Warner Hassells (fl. 1680-1710), German painter
Warner Hastings, 15th Earl of Huntingdon (1868–1939), British nobleman
Warner Jepson (1930–2011), American composer
Warner Jorgenson (1918–2005), Canadian politician
Warner T. Koiter (1914–1997), Dutch mechanical engineer
Warner E. Leighton (1930–2005), American film editor
Warner LeRoy (1935–2001), American businessman
Warner Mack (1935-2022) American singer-songwriter
Warner Madrigal (born 1984), Dominican baseball player
Warner McCollum (1933–2009), American gridiron football coach
Warner Mifflin (1745–1798), American abolitionist
Warner Miller (1838–1918), American politician
Warner Mizell 1907–1971), American gridiron football player
Warner Oland (1879–1938), Swedish actor
Warner Richmond (1886–1948), American actor
Warner S. Rodimon (1907–2005), American naval officer
Warner Sallman (1892–1968), American painter 
Warner R. Schilling (1925–2013), American political scientist 
Warner B. Snider (1880–1965), American politician
Warner Troyer (1932–1991), Canadian broadcast journalist and writer
Warner Underwood (1808–1872), American politician
Warner Westenra, 2nd Baron Rossmore (1765–1842), Irish politician
Warner Wing (1805–1876), American jurist and legislator
Warner Wolf (born 1937), American broadcaster
Warner P. Woodworth, American academic

Middle name
Augustine Warner Robins (1882–1940), American Air Force general
Caroline Warner Hightower (born 1935), American executive
David Warner Hagen (born 1931), American Judge
George Warner Allen (1916–1988), British artist
Gerald Warner Brace (1901–1978), American writer, educator, sailor and boat builder
H. Warner Munn (1903–1981), American writer
Henry Warner Birge (1825–1888), American general 
Hiram Warner Farnsworth (1816–1899), American abolitionist
J. Warner Wallace (born 1961), American detective
James Warner Bellah (1899–1976), American author 
John Warner Barber (1798–1885), American engraver and historian
John Warner Fitzgerald (1924–2006), American politician and judge
John Warner Smith (born 1952), American poet and educator
Joseph Warner Murphy (1892–1977), Canadian politician
Julia Warner Snow (1863–1927), American botanist
K. Warner Schaie (born 1928), American gerontologist and psychologist
Margaret Warner Morley (1858–1923), American biologist, and author
William Warner Bishop (1871–1955), American librarian

See also

Wagner (given name)
Werner (name)

Notes